Abū al-Ḥasan ʿAlī ibn Mūsā ibn Saʿīd al-Maghribī (1213–1286), also known as Ibn Saʿīd al-Andalusī, was an Arab geographer, historian, poet, and the most important collector of poetry from al-Andalus in the 12th and 13th centuries.

Biography

Ibn Said was born at Alcalá la Real near Granada to a prominent family which was descended from the Companion of the Prophet Ammar ibn Yasir. Many of his family members were literary figures, and grew up in Marrakesh. He subsequently studied in Seville and stayed in Tunis, Alexandria, Cairo, Jerusalem and Aleppo. At the age of 30, he undertook a pilgrimage to Mecca. He was also a close friend of the Muwallad poet Ibn Mokond Al-Lishboni (of Lisbon). His last years were spent in Tunis, and he died there in 1286.

Writings

Ibn Said al-Maghribi wrote or compiled 'at least forty works on various branches of knowledge'.

Ibn Said's best known achievement was the completion of the fifteen-volume al-Mughrib fī ḥulā l-Maghrib ('The Extraordinary Book on the Adornments of the West'), which had been started over a century before by Abū Muḥammad al-Ḥijārī (1106–55) at the behest of Ibn Said's great-grandfather ‘Abd al-Malik. Abū Muḥammad al-Ḥijārī completed 6 volumes, ‘Abd al-Malik added to them; two of ‘Abd al-Malik's sons (Ibn Said's grandfather and great uncle) added more; Ibn Said's father worked on it further; and Ibn Said completed it. The work is also known as the Kitāb al-Mughrib ('book of the Maghrib'), and is midway between an anthology of poetry and a geography, collecting information on the poets of Maghreb organized by geographical origin.

Part of the Mughrib circulated separately as Rāyāt al-mubarrizīn wa-ghāyāt al-mumayyazīn (Banners of the Champions and the Standards of the Distinguished), which Ibn Said compiled in Cairo, completing it on 21 June 1243 (641 by Islamic dating). It is, in the words of Louis Crompton, 'perhaps the most important' of the various medieval Andalucian poetry anthologies. 'His aim in compiling the collection seems to have been to show that poetry produced in the West was as good as anything the East had to offer (and that stuff by Ibn Sa'id and his family was especially good)'.

As an indefatigable traveller, Ibn Said was profoundly interested in geography. In 1250 he wrote his Kitab bast al- ard fi 't -t ul wa-'l-'ard (The Book of the Extension of the Land on Longitudes and Latitudes). His Kitab al-Jughrafiya (Geography) embodies the experience of his extensive travels through the Muslim world and on the shores of the Indian Ocean. He also gives an account of parts of northern Europe including Ireland and Iceland. He visited Armenia and was at the Court of Hulagu Khan from 1256 to 1265.

Ibn Said's works that are probably preserved only fragmentarily, in quotation by others, include Al-Ṭāli‘ al-Sa‘ı̄d fı̄ Tārı̄kh Banı̄ Sa‘ı̄d, a history of the Banū Sa‘ı̄d.

An example of Ibn Said's own poems, which he included in the Rāyāt al-mubarrizīn wa-ghāyāt al-mumayyazīn, is "Black horse with a white chest", here from Cola Franzen's translation into English of Gómez's 1930 Spanish translation:

Black hindquarters, white chest:
he flies on the wings of the wind.
When you look at him you see dark night
opening, giving way to dawn.
Sons of Shem and Ham live harmoniously
in him, and take no care for the words
of would-be troublemakers.
Men's eyes light up when they see
reflected in his beauty
the clear strong black and white
of the eyes of beautiful women.

Notes

External links
 Geographia, in Arabic
 Excerpt from the Book of the Maghrib, in English

References
Ali Ibn Musa Ibn Said al-Magribi und sein Werk al-Gusun al-yaniafi mahasin su ara al-miça as-sabia by M. Kropp, in: Islam (Der) Berlin, 1980, vol. 57, no. 1, pp. 68–96 (2p.)
His history of the world and Islamic literature: ms. Escorial 1728. edition by Ibrahim al-Ibyari (2 vol.), Cairo 1968

The Banners of the Champions of Ibn Said al-Maghribi, translated by James Bellamy and Patricia Steiner (Madison: Hispanic Seminary of Medieval Studies, 1988)

1213 births
1286 deaths
13th-century Arabs
Poets from al-Andalus
13th-century writers from al-Andalus
Geographers from Al-Andalus
13th-century geographers
Travelers in Asia Minor